This is a list of election results for the electoral district of Stirling in South Australian elections.

Members for Stirling

Election results

Elections in the 1960s

Elections in the 1950s

 Preferences were not distributed.

Elections in the 1940s

 Sitting MP for Stirling, Herbert Dunn had been elected as an Independent in the previous election, but joined the LCL before this election.

Elections in the 1930s

References

South Australian state electoral results by district